Trapania bonellenae is a species of sea slug, a dorid nudibranch, a marine gastropod mollusc in the family Goniodorididae.

Distribution
This species was described from Bonaire.

Description
The body of this goniodorid nudibranch is black with a tracery of fine interlinked white lines. The gills, rhinophores, lateral papillae and oral tentacles are translucent with black and white spots. There are white bands across the body between the rhinophores and in front of the gills.

Ecology
Trapania bonellenae feeds on Entoprocta which often grow on sponges and other living substrata.

References

Goniodorididae
Gastropods described in 2009